The Major Religions: An Introduction with Texts is a textbook on religions and religious texts by Thomas Patrick Burke, first published in 1996 by Blackwell, with a second edition published in 2004. The book has received reviews from journals including Pacifica and Religious Studies Review, along with being cited in its field and in use by educational institutions.

Table of contents 

 Part I: The Religions of Indian Origin
 1. Hinduism. Hinduism Texts.
 2. Buddhism. Buddhism Texts.
 3. Sikhism. Sikhism Texts.

 Part II: The Religions of Chinese Origin
 4. Traditional Chinese Religion and Confucianism. Confucianism Texts.
 5. Taoism. Taoism Texts.
 6. Chinese Buddhism. Chinese Buddhism Texts.

 Part III: The Religions of Semitic Origin
 7. Judaism. Israelite Religion. Rabbinic Judaism. Judaism Texts.
 8. Islam. Islam Texts.
 9. Christianity. Christianity Texts.

See also 

 The Concept of Justice: Is Social Justice Just?, another book by Burke

References 

1996 non-fiction books
2004 non-fiction books
Books about religion
Textbooks